Kemar Michael Lawrence (born 17 September 1992) is a Jamaican professional footballer who plays as a left-back for Major League Soccer club Minnesota United and the Jamaica national team.

His nickname is Taxi. In January 2014, Lawrence was announced as a brand ambassador for PepsiCo as part of the 2014 FUTBOLNOW campaign featuring footballers such as Lionel Messi and Sergio Agüero.

Early life
Lawrence is the son of former goalkeeper Orville 'Tutus' Edwards, rated among the best goalkeepers in the Caribbean during his career, who played for Santos FC and the Jamaica national team during the 1970s, and who died in 2005 at 53 years of age from kidney failure.

Club career

Jamaica
In 2003, Lawrence began his career in the youth ranks of Rae Town football club.

In 2007, he signed for Harbour View, and was part of their National Premier League-winning teams in the 2009–2010. In 2009 Lawrence was briefly part of the residency program of the Canadian club Vancouver Whitecaps, then of the American USL First Division. After primarily playing for Harbour View's U20 team, he broke into the first team in 2011, making a total of 50 appearances. 

In 2012, he briefly moved to Arnett Gardens F.C., before returning to Harbour View in September. He was part of Harbour View's championship squad in 2012–2013 seasons. 

In 2014 he was selected for the inaugural MLS Caribbean Combine. In July 2014, Lawrence went to the United States for a two-week trial with MLS club D.C. United but was not offered a contract.

New York Red Bulls

On 16 March 2015 it was announced that Lawrence had signed with New York Red Bulls of Major League Soccer after impressing during a preseason trial. On 22 March 2015, Lawrence made his debut for New York playing the full 90 in a 2–0 victory over rival D.C. United at Red Bull Arena. After strong performances at left-back, Lawrence beat out long time defender Roy Miller for the starting spot. On 18 October 2015, Lawrence scored his first goal for New York in a 4–1 victory over Philadelphia Union, helping the club clinch the Eastern Conference regular season title.

On 29 April 2017 Lawrence scored the game-winning goal in New York's 2–1 victory over Chicago Fire. On 23 June 2018 Lawrence scored his first goal of the season in a 3-0 victory over FC Dallas. A week later, on 1 July, Lawrence scored the lone goal in New York's 1-0 victory over Toronto FC.

Anderlecht
On 31 January 2020, Lawrence moved to Anderlecht for fee of 1.25 million euros. He made his debut on 7 March, as a substitute, in a 7-0 win against Zulte Waregem. On 28 February 2021, he scored his first goal for Anderlecht, scoring the second goal in a 3-1 victory over Standard Liège.

Toronto FC
On 7 May 2021, he returned to Major League Soccer, joining Toronto FC. On 12 May, he made his debut, coming on as a substitute in a 2-0 victory over the Columbus Crew. On 7 July, Lawrence scored his first goal for Toronto against the New England Revolution, netting the second Toronto goal in an eventual 3-2 victory. Ahead of the 2022 season, he did not join the club for pre-season, as the club worked on a move for him.

Minnesota United
On March 17, 2022, he was traded to Minnesota United FC in exchange for the MLS rights to Sean O'Hearn and a conditional $50,000 in General Allocation Money.

International career
At the international level, Lawrence has represented the Jamaica under-17 team, the Jamaica under-20, and the national team of Jamaica, the Reggae Boyz.

Lawrence competed in the 2011 CONCACAF U-20 Championship in Guatemala, taking part in Jamaica's two first-round defeats, and receiving a yellow card in the second match against Honduras.

After being part of national team training camps in 2013, Lawrence was first selected for the Reggae Boyz for the CONCACAF Fourth Round qualifying match against Panama in Panama City in September 2013. Lawrence received his first cap in a friendly against Trinidad and Tobago at the Montego Bay Sports Complex in Montego Bay in November 2013.

Lawrence appeared in all four matches of the Jamaica national team's international tour in the summer of 2014, which saw them play 2014 FIFA World Cup-bound France and Switzerland, along with Serbia and Egypt.

In September 2014, Lawrence scored his first goal for Jamaica in a 3–1 friendly defeat against Canada. Later that year, in November, he scored Jamaica's first goal against Antigua and Barbuda, which came in the final group stage match of their 2014 Caribbean Cup-winning campaign.

Lawrence played at the 2015 Copa América and, despite Jamaica losing all three matches 1–0, Lawrence was deemed the best left-back in the tournament by Rio-based football writer and broadcaster Tim Vickery.

On 23 July 2017, Lawrence scored on a left-footed freekick from just outside of the box to eliminate tournament favorites Mexico and send Jamaica to a second straight Gold Cup Final.

Style of play
Lawrence plays most often on the left side of defence, specialising in the role of a wing-back. Ian Burnett, writing for The Jamaica Observer, described Lawrence as "a feisty wide defender who is solid in defence and on offence", while Winfried Schäfer, former manager of the Jamaica national team, said that Lawrence is a player with good pace and intelligence on the field, while stating his belief that he is a player with "a chance to play in Europe". Leicester City captain and Jamaica teammate Wes Morgan noted Lawrence's defensive abilities in dealing with Switzerland and Bayern Munich winger Xherdan Shaqiri, and he was also praised for his technical quality and attitude by Jamaica teammate and Crystal Palace defender Adrian Mariappa.

Career statistics

Club

International

International goals
Scores and results list Jamaica's goal tally first.

Honours
New York Red Bulls
Supporters' Shield: 2015, 2018

Individual
MLS Best XI: 2018
CONCACAF Gold Cup Best XI: 2017
MLS All-Star: 2019
IFFHS CONCACAF Team of the Decade: 2011–2020

References

External links
 
 Harbour View FC Senior Team List at hvfc.net
 
 jamaicanfootballers.com

1992 births
Living people
Jamaican footballers
Jamaican expatriate footballers
Jamaica international footballers
Sportspeople from Kingston, Jamaica
Association football defenders
Harbour View F.C. players
New York Red Bulls players
R.S.C. Anderlecht players
Toronto FC players
Minnesota United FC players
Expatriate footballers in Belgium
Expatriate soccer players in the United States
Jamaican expatriate sportspeople in Belgium
Jamaican expatriate sportspeople in the United States
Major League Soccer players
National Premier League players
2014 Caribbean Cup players
2015 Copa América players
2015 CONCACAF Gold Cup players
Copa América Centenario players
2017 CONCACAF Gold Cup players
2019 CONCACAF Gold Cup players
2021 CONCACAF Gold Cup players